Stamping Ground is a home rule-class city in Scott County, Kentucky, United States. The population was 643 at the 2010 census. It is part of the Lexington–Fayette Metropolitan Statistical Area.

History

It was named for the activity of herds of bison in the area. The town was established in 1817 and named Herndonsville for the local Herndon family. In 1834 the name was changed to Stamping Ground. A Stamping Ground post office operated for a short time in 1816. The Herndonsville post office operated from 1823 until 1834, when it was renamed Stamping Ground.1

Geography

According to the United States Census Bureau, the city has a total area of 0.6 square mile (1.7 km), all land.

Government and politics

Mayor
On November 6, 2018, Keith Murphy was elected Mayor of Stamping Ground.  Murphy defeated Allan Lee Neal 134 to 53.

Demographics

As of the census of 2000, there were 566 people, 230 households, and 152 families living in the city. The racial makeup of the city was 98.59% White, 0.35% African American, 0.53% Native American, 0.18% Asian, and 0.35% from two or more races. Hispanic or Latino of any race were 0.53% of the population.

There were 230 households, out of which 36.5% had children under the age of 18 living with them, 54.8% were married couples living together, 8.3% had a female householder with no husband present, and 33.9% were non-families. 30.9% of all households were made up of individuals, and 20.0% had someone living alone who was 65 years of age or older. The average household size was 2.46 and the average family size was 3.11.

In the city, the population was spread out, with 27.4% under the age of 18, 9.5% from 18 to 24, 30.2% from 25 to 44, 16.4% from 45 to 64, and 16.4% who were 65 years of age or older. The median age was 34 years. For every 100 females, there were 98.6 males. For every 100 females age 18 and over, there were 90.3 males.

The median income for a household in the city was $32,250, and the median income for a family was $43,500. Males had a median income of $31,161 versus $21,750 for females. The per capita income for the city was $17,047. About 2.5% of families and 8.2% of the population were below the poverty line, including 7.0% of those under age 18 and 18.1% of those age 65 or over.

Education
Stamping Ground is home to a single school, Stamping Ground Elementary School.

Notable residents
 Dr. Jack Cottrell Christian theologian, associated with the Christian churches and churches of Christ, Professor of Theology at Cincinnati Christian University.

See also

 List of cities in Kentucky

References

External links

Cities in Scott County, Kentucky
Cities in Kentucky
Lexington–Fayette metropolitan area